Todd or Todds may refer to:

Places 
Australia
 Todd River, an ephemeral river

United States
 Todd Valley, California, also known as Todd, an unincorporated community
 Todd, Missouri, a ghost town
 Todd, North Carolina, an unincorporated community
 Todd County, Kentucky
 Todd County, Minnesota
 Todd County, South Dakota
 Todd Fork, a river in Ohio
 Todd Township, Minnesota
 Todd Township, Fulton County, Pennsylvania
 Todd Township, Huntingdon County, Pennsylvania
 Todds, Ohio, an unincorporated community

People
 Todd (given name)
 Todd (surname)

Arts and entertainment
 Todd (album), a 1974 album by Todd Rundgren
 Todd (Cars), a character in Cars
 Todd (Stargate), a recurring character in the series Stargate Atlantis
 The Todd (Scrubs), a character on Scrubs

Other uses 
 Todd (elm cultivar)
 Todd class, a characteristic class in algebraic topology
 Todd-AO, a company in film post-production
 Todd Corporation, a New Zealand conglomerate

See also
 TOD (disambiguation)
 Justice Todd (disambiguation)
 Toddy (disambiguation)